Blaise Cronin (born 1949) is an Irish-American information scientist and bibliometrician. He is the Rudy Professor Emeritus of Information Science at Indiana University, Bloomington, where he was Dean of the School of Library and Information Science for seventeen years. From 1985 to 1991 he held the Chair of Information Science and was Head of the Department of Information Science at the University of Strathclyde in Glasgow, U.K.

Biography

Cronin was well known for his work in bibliometrics and scientometrics. He also was known for researching and understanding the importance of acknowledgements in scholarly papers.

Awards and honors
 2014 Jason Farradane Award
 2013 Derek de Solla Price Memorial Medal for "outstanding contributions to the fields of quantitative studies of science."
 Honorary Visiting professor, Department of Information Science, City University London, 2007-
 Visiting professor, School of Computing, Mathematical and Information Science, University of Brighton, 2007-2010
 Award of Merit, American Society for Information Science and Technology, 2006
 Rudy Professor of Information Science, Indiana University, 1999-
 Talis Information Visiting professor of Information Science, Manchester Metropolitan University, 1996-2003
 Visiting professor, School of Computing, Napier University, Edinburgh, 2000-
 Visiting professor of Information Management, Napier University, Edinburgh, 1999-2000
 Doctor of Letters (Honoris Causa), Queen Margaret University College, Edinburgh, 1997
 Fellow, Royal Society of Arts, 1998
 Fellow, Institute of Management, 1989
 Fellow, Institute of Information Scientists, 1988
 Fellow, Library Association, 1984

Publications
Blaise Cronin has published more than 300 documents, including monographs, scientific articles, opinion papers, conference papers. Among his publications are:

1984: The citation process. The role and significance of citations in scientific communication. London: Taylor Graham, 
1988: Post-professionalism: transforming the information heartland. London: Taylor Graham (with Elizabeth Davenport).
1991: Elements of information management. Metuchen, NJ: Scarecrow Press (with Elizabeth Davenport).
1995: The scholar's courtesy: The role of acknowledgement in the primary communication process. London: Taylor Graham.
2000: The web of knowledge: A Festschrift in honor of Eugene Garfield. Medford, NJ: Information Today (with H.B. Atkins,Eds.). 
2005: The Hand of Science: Academic Writing and its Rewards. Lanham, MD: Scarecrow Press.

He edited Journal of the Association for Information Science and Technology and Annual Review of Information Science and Technology

References

1949 births
Living people
Information scientists
Bibliometricians